Chelativorans is a genus of Gram-negative, strictly aerobic, non-motile bacteria.

References

Phyllobacteriaceae
Bacteria genera